St. Charles / Resurrection Cemeteries is a Roman Catholic cemetery of the Diocese of Brooklyn in East Farmingdale, New York.

History 
It was formed from two separate but adjoining cemeteries: Resurrection Cemetery was originally created and operated by the Archdiocese of New York, while St. Charles Cemetery was created by the Diocese of Brooklyn.  Both were purchased by their respective diocese in 1914 from the Pinelawn Cemetery Corporation, and the first burials in St. Charles took place in 1937 as St. John Cemetery in Queens began to fill.  In 1953, Resurrection Cemetery was sold to the Diocese of Brooklyn and they were combined into a single cemetery.

Notable burials 
Among those interred here are:
 Cesare Bonventre, mobster
 Peter J. Brennan, United States Secretary of Labor
 Walt Brown, Racecar driver
 "Jimmy the Gent" Burke, mobster
 Mary Ann Ganser, singer with The Shangri-Las
 Gil Clancy, boxing coach and commentator
 DeFeo Family murder victims, died in a 1974 killing, whose story inspired The Amityville Horror
 William M. Feehan, FDNY Deputy Commissioner
 Vincent Gardenia, actor
 Vitas Gerulaitis, pro tennis player
 Glenn Hughes, singer
 Joseph Magliocco, mobster
 Frank McGlynn, actor
 Maggie McNamara, actress
 Johnny Roventini, dwarf actor
 Ray Sharkey, actor
 Peter Steele, musician
 Carol Ann Susi,  actress
 Eva Taylor, singer, actress
 Anthony Trentacosta, mobster
 Frank Buckley Walker, talent agent
 Clarence Williams, composer, musician

See also
 List of cemeteries in the United States

References

External links
 
 
 

Roman Catholic cemeteries in New York (state)
Cemeteries in Suffolk County, New York
Roman Catholic Diocese of Brooklyn
Oyster Bay (town), New York